Fred I. Parker (February 2, 1938 – August 12, 2003) was a United States circuit judge of the United States Court of Appeals for the Second Circuit and a United States district judge of the United States District Court for the District of Vermont.

Education and career

Parker was born in Boston, Massachusetts. He received a Bachelor of Arts degree from the University of Massachusetts in 1962. He received a Juris Doctor from Georgetown University Law Center in 1965. He was in the United States Marine Corps Reserve from 1955 to 1962. He was in private practice of law in Boston from 1965 to 1966. He was in private practice of law in Burlington, Vermont from 1966 to 1969. He was a deputy state attorney general of Vermont from 1969 to 1972. He was in private practice of law in Middlebury, Vermont from 1972 to 1982. He was in private practice of law in Burlington from 1982 to 1990. As of 2020, Parker is the last judge appointed to the District of Vermont by a Republican president.

Federal judicial service

Parker was nominated by President George H. W. Bush on June 21, 1990, to a seat on the United States District Court for the District of Vermont vacated by Judge Albert W. Coffrin. He was confirmed by the United States Senate on August 3, 1990, and received commission on August 7, 1990. He served as Chief Judge from 1991 to 1994. His service was terminated on October 11, 1994, due to elevation to the Second Circuit.

Parker was a federal judge on the United States Court of Appeals for the Second Circuit. Parker was nominated by President Bill Clinton on August 25, 1994, to a seat on the United States Court of Appeals for the Second Circuit vacated by James Lowell Oakes. He was confirmed by the Senate on October 7, 1994, and received commission on October 11, 1994. His service was terminated on August 12, 2003, due to death.

Death 

Parker died on August 12, 2003, in Burlington.  The Associated Press reported at that time that Parker had been undergoing a procedure to adjust a pacemaker.

References

Sources

1938 births
2003 deaths
Georgetown University Law Center alumni
Judges of the United States Court of Appeals for the Second Circuit
Judges of the United States District Court for the District of Vermont
United States court of appeals judges appointed by Bill Clinton
United States district court judges appointed by George H. W. Bush
20th-century American judges
University of Massachusetts Amherst alumni
Lawyers from Boston
Vermont lawyers
Military personnel from Massachusetts
21st-century American judges